The Aberdale Cycle Company was founded in 1919. The company concentrated on high volume, popular bicycles. In the mid-1930s the company moved to a modern factory in London and also acquired the Bown Manufacturing Company. Bown brought experience of building motorcycles and with rising demand for motorised transport after 1945, the company began producing mopeds and light-weight motorcycles at their London plant and in Wales. In 1958 Aberdale were acquired by the British Cycle Corporation while the Aberdale management went on to found Trusty Manufacturing Co Ltd.

History

Aberdale Cycle Company was founded in 1919 by the father of Joseph and Leslie Levy. Joseph joined the company when he was 14 and within a few years was selling the company's bicycles from a wheelbarrow. He progressed to become sales manager when he was only 23.

Evidently the company was thriving and in 1934 it moved to a newly constructed Bridport Works at Edmonton, London. Around this time, the company acquired another bicycle manufacturer, Bown Manufacturing Company appointing the owner, William A.R. Bown, to the board. Bown's personal expertise was in engineering and it seems the Levy brothers preferred to focus their energies on the commercial aspects of the business. By 1936 the company boasted a range of 50 bicycles at the Olympia Show. The Bown name was already established as a marque of quality and bicycles such as the Bown Xtralite were produced in 1937. In 1941, Joe was appointed Managing Director.

During World War II commercial production ceased as the company committed itself to the production of war materials including small generating sets for use in aeroplanes.

After the war, the demand for economic, personal, motorised transport blossomed. Using Bown's technical expertise in motorcycle manufacture, the company launched the Aberdale Autocycle in March 1947. The autocycle was powered by a 98cc Villiers Junior de Luxe engine. It was a typical machine of the period but included a custom toolkit and a Smiths speedometer placing it in the higher end of the market, certainly compared to their usual high-volume products. One special machine was created, painted with Post Office livery of bright red in an attempt to gain a contract from the Royal Mail; it looked so good, a limited edition was offered as an alternative to the traditional black with gold piping. Joseph Levy also toured North America promoting both the autocycle and the company's Gresham Flyer child's tricycle. Less than 2,000 autocycles were eventually produced overall by 1948.

Late in 1948, Villiers announced the introduction of their 2F engine; Aberdale, like most of their rival manufacturers such as Francis Barnett, began to redesign their cycle to accommodate the new engine showing a prototype at the  Earls Court Show in November 1948. However, the new machine never materialised. In 1949 the company was provided with a factory in Llwynypia, Wales under the government's Advanced Factories Scheme. W.A.R.Bown was charged with developing the new production facility consequently delaying the immediate development of the 2F machine. It took until 1950 before a 2F-powered machine came to market as the Bown Auto-roadster again exploiting the Bown marque with the epithets Hand Built and  Since 1860. William Bown continued to develop motorcycles for the company releasing the Bown 1F in 1951. Some 3,000 of autocycles were produced.

In 1952, a Villiers powered 122cc motorcycle was introduced. It too was marketed under the Bown marque and also built at the factory in Wales. It was raced at the Isle of Man TT permitting it to be legitimately marketed as the Bown "Tourist Trophy". Only 200 machines are believed to have been built.

In 1954, sales plummeted for Aberdale, along with other autocycle manufacturers, as the market for autocycles collapsed. High production costs of their motorised products added to the company's difficulties and in the winter of 1954/55 the factory in Wales closed. By this time, the company's product licences were being progressively transferred to the British Cycle Corporation.

The company limped on, assembling a German manufactured moped. In 1955 the Bown marque made its final appearance at the Earls Court Show with a Bown-branded Zweirad Union moped powered by a Sachs 49cc engine called the Bown "50". The machines were manufactured in Germany and assembled at the Edmonton plant although minor modifications may have been added in London. The last moped left the factory in 1958 though they continued to appear in sales lists until all stocks were cleared in 1959.

The company formally closed in early 1959 as the Edmonton plant shut and remaining assets were transferred to the British Cycle Corporation in Handsworth, Birmingham. Aberdale remained a subsidiary of Raleigh until 1976.

The Levy brothers, William A.R. Bown and former colleagues from Aberdale went on to form Trusty Manufacturing Co. Ltd to manufacture scooters & cycles for children.

Motorcycles

Aberdale built autocycles and lightweight motorcycles between 1946 and 1959. Engines used were 98cc and 123cc Villiers units and Sachs two-stroke engines.

 1947 Aberdale autocycle
 1949 Bown auto-roadster
 1951 Bown 1F
 1952 Bown "Tourist Trophy"
 1955 Bown "50"

References

External links
 Grace's Guide Aberdale
 1948 Aberdale Autocycle
 Aberdale Autocycle
 98cc autocycle
 1952 Bown 98cc
 Images of 1954 Bown
 1953 Bown 1F
 "Tourist Trophy" flyer
 "Tourist Trophy" specifications
 Close-up of "Tourist Trophy" engine
 Bown moped
 Bown "50"

→

Motorcycle manufacturers of the United Kingdom
Defunct motorcycle manufacturers of the United Kingdom
Manufacturing companies based in London